Justice McFadden may refer to:

Joseph J. McFadden, associate justice of the Idaho Supreme Court
Obadiah B. McFadden, associate justice of the Oregon Supreme Court

See also
Ed F. McFaddin, associate justice of the Arkansas Supreme Court